The Wood–Armer method is a structural analysis method based on finite element analysis used to design the reinforcement for concrete slabs. This method provides simple equations to design a concrete slab based on the output from a finite element analysis software.

References

Finite element method
Structural analysis